Secrets (Saladused) is an Estonian television drama series created by Tuuli Roosma. Each story is made by different producer, such as Anri Rulkov, Arbo Tammiksaar, Rando Pettai, Marianne Kõrver, Ergo Kuld, Jan-Erik Nõgisto, Rain Tolk.

Tuuli Roosma's presented show recovers the Estonian people relationship dramas and scandals.

Its premiere was on Kanal 2 on 31 March 2008.

Episodes 
{| class="wikitable plainrowheaders" style="width:99%;"
|-style="color:black"
! style="background: #F5EF78;" |Series
! style="background: #F5EF78;" |Season
! style="background: #F5EF78;" |Title
! style="background: #F5EF78;" |Directed by
! style="background: #F5EF78;" |Written by
! style="background: #F5EF78;" |Original air date
|-

|}

Lists of drama television series episodes